The Hoback River, once called the Fall River, is an approximately -long tributary of the Snake River in the U.S. state of Wyoming. It heads in the northern Wyoming Range of Wyoming and flows northeast, northwest, and then west through the Bridger-Teton National Forest. Its largest tributary is its South Fork, which joins the Hoback about nine miles downstream of its head as it turns northeast and continues to U.S. Route 191. It then turns northwest, where it spreads onto a large marshy flat in a braided floodplain once known as Jackson's Little Hole, but now referred to as the "Hoback Basin" in which lies the town of Bondurant. The entire length of the Hoback is free flowing and unobstructed by dams.

The river is named after John Hoback, an explorer who traveled with the Astor Expedition from the Snake River, using the Hoback River as a passage to the Green River, a tributary of the Colorado River.

See also
 Greys River
 Salt River
 List of rivers of Wyoming

References and external links

Rivers of Wyoming
Tributaries of the Snake River
Rivers of Teton County, Wyoming
Wild and Scenic Rivers of the United States